French Bar Creek Provincial Park is a provincial park in British Columbia, Canada, located 60 kilometres north of Lillooet, British Columbia. The park, which is 1159 ha. in size, was established in 2010.

External links
Backgrounder

Provincial parks of British Columbia
2010 establishments in British Columbia
Protected areas established in 2010